The Men's Club, popularly known as TMC, is a Nigerian web series created by Urban Vision and directed by Tola Odunsi. It was first released in October 2018 on REDTV's youtube channel. It has had 3 seasons, with some holiday special editions.

Plot summary 
The Men's Club''' revolves around four male main characters and how they relate with their partners and the ordeals that they face in their everyday life. The show stars Ayoola Ayolola, Baaj Adebule, Efa Iwara, and Daniel Etim-Effiong in the titular lead roles and Sola Sobowale, Shaffy Bello, Sharon Ooja, Adebukola Oladipupo, Mimi Chaka, Enado Odigie and many others in supporting roles. After the completion of season 3, RED TV announced an addendum special edition to the show, "The Men's Club Holiday Special", which consisted of three different editions aired on Christmas Day, Boxing Day and New Year's Day.

 Episodes 
 Season 1: 10 Episodes
 Season 2: 13 Episodes
 Season 3: 13 Episodes
 The Men's Club Holiday Special: 3 Episodes

 Selected cast 
 Ayoola Ayolola as Aminu Garba
 Baaj Adebule as Louis Okafor
 Daniel Etim-Effiong as Lanre Taiwo
 Sharon Ooja as Jasmine
 Shaffy Bello as Mrs Teni Doregos
 Sola Sobowale as Mama Jasmine
 Adebukola Oladipupo as Tiara Bewaji 
 Efa Iwara as Tayo Oladapo
 Mimi Chaka as Tumini
 Nengi Adoki as Lola Doregos
 Enado Odigie as Hadiza
 Segilola Ogidan as Tonye

 Exit of Ayoola Ayolola 
In 2021, Tola Odunsi, the director, announced that Ayolola would no longer be playing the lead role of Aminu Garba via an Instagram post as he was unavailable to play the role. He was to be replaced by the former Big Brother Naija housemate, Pere Egbi. Due to speculation that he relocated without notifying the show runners, Ayolola reacted to the announcent via his Instagram page writing “Contrary to what was said, I did not relocate without letting the executive producers and producers of the show know, My decision to make a ‘temporary’ move out of the country was a long thought out process in which the producer/my manager at the time was aware of and involved in. With that being said, I cannot wait to be back on your screens again."

 Award and recognition The Men's Club'' won the Gage Award for the best web series of 2020 on April 24, 2021. The show also was named the best African series at the HAP Awards (Hollywood & African Prestigious Awards) 2021. Ayoola Ayolola and Sharon Ooja also won awards for best actor and best supporting actor respectively.

References

2010s Nigerian television series
2018 Nigerian television series debuts
Nigerian television series
Nigerian web series